This is a chronological list of snooker ranking tournaments. Ranking tournaments are those that are used for the official system of ranking professional snooker players which is used to determine automatic qualification and seeding for tournaments on the World Snooker Tour.

History

The first rankings were produced after the 1976 World Snooker Championship and were based on performances in the 1974, 1975 and 1976 World Championships. Because of this system, the 1974 World Snooker Championship is now regarded as being the first ranking tournament.

The same system was used for a number of years but the rankings for the 1983/84 season included performances in two additional tournaments during the 1982/83 season.

In 1992/93 and from the 2010/11 to the 2015/16 season there were a number of tournaments which contributed to the world rankings but at a lower rate than standard ranking tournaments. These tournaments are referred to as "minor-ranking tournaments". All the minor-ranking tournaments from 2010 to 2016 were part of the Players Tour Championship. These events are not included in the list below.

Winners

Ronnie O'Sullivan holds the record with 39 wins in ranking tournaments. 74 players have won at least one ranking event. The most recent first-time winner is Chris Wakelin who won the 2023 Snooker Shoot Out.

Tournaments

R – ranking tournament number. Date – date of the final day of the tournament. Numbers in brackets in the Winner and Runner-up columns refer to the number of times the player had been a winner or runner-up at that time. Sc– frame score in the final. RR– Final stage was a Round-robin.

See also
List of world number-one snooker players

References

 
Ranking tournaments
Ranking tournaments